Oil and gas are two commonly associated fossil fuels.  The phrase may refer to:

Oil and gas field
Oil and gas law in the United States

See also
 Gasoline or petrol
 Heating oil
 Hydrocarbon exploration
 Natural gas
 Petroleum industry
 Petroleum (crude oil)